Sir Joseph Francis Olliffe  (1808 – 14 March 1869) was an Irish-born British physician.

Early life
Sir Joseph Olliffe was born in 1808 in Cork, Ireland. His father was Joseph Francis Olliffe (c. 1776 – 1830), a merchant of Cork. His mother was Elizabeth McCarthy (1777 – 10 March 1851), who was the daughter of Charles McCarthy of Sunville, County Limerick.

Career

He was educated in Paris, and graduated Master of Arts at the university in 1829, and Doctor of Medicine in 1840. For some time he acted as tutor in the family of the Count de Cresnoi, but in 1840 he commenced the practice of medicine in Paris. He was a fellow of the Anatomical Society of Paris, and at one period filled the post of president of the Paris Medical Society. 

In 1846, Louis-Philippe appointed Olliffe a knight of the Legion of Honour, and he was promoted to the rank of Officer in 1855 by Napoleon III.

In March 1852 he became physician to the British embassy, and on 13 June 1853 was knighted at Buckingham Palace.

The board of trade nominated him a juror for hygiene, pharmacy, surgery, and medicine in the French international exhibition in April 1855; in 1861 he was appointed one of the committee for sanitary appliances in the international exhibition of 1862, and he became a fellow of the Royal College of Physicians of London in 1859. He enjoyed for many years a large practice and considerable social position.

Marriage and issue
On 19 April 1841, Sir Joseph married Laura Cubitt, who was born on 2 February 1823 in St Pancras, London, England and died in 1898 in London. She was the second daughter of William Cubitt, Lord Mayor of London; the couple inherited a large fortune from her father. The couple bore two children:

Mary Emma Olliffe (1845 - 2 April 1897; married Sir Frank Lascelles)
Florence Eveleen Eleanore Olliffe (1851 - 16 May 1930; married Sir Thomas Hugh Bell, 2nd Baronet and would later become Dame Florence Bell, DBE)

Later life
Sir Joseph Olliffe was the friend and personal physician of Charles de Morny, Duke of Morny, whom he joined in extensive building operations at Deauville, France. 

He died in Brighton, England on 14 March 1869.

References

Attribution
 

1808 births
1869 deaths
People from County Cork
People from Brighton
19th-century Irish medical doctors
Officiers of the Légion d'honneur
Fellows of the Royal College of Physicians
Knights Bachelor